Pamela Beth Radcliff is an American historian and professor at the University of California at San Diego and an authority on the history of modern Spain. Her research focuses on mass politics, gender issues, civil society and democratic transitions. She did a Teaching Company course entitled Interpreting the 20th century: the Struggle over Democracy. Her publications on modern Spanish history received numerous positive reviews. She has received numerous awards for her scholarship and teaching, such as the Keller-Sierra Prize for her monograph From Mobilization to Civil War: The politics of polarization in the Spanish city of Gijón, 1900-1937.

Selected publications
 Interpreting the 20th century: the Struggle over Democracy, The Teaching Company, Chantilly, Virginia, 2004
 From mobilization to Civil War: The politics of polarization in the Spanish city of Gijón, 1900-1937, Cambridge University Press, 1996) Published in 2004 by the editor Debate in Spanish with the title De la movilización a la Guerra Civil. Historia política y social de Gijón (1900-1937), pp. 269–271, p. (Palgrave Macmillan, 2011).  
 Constructing Spanish Womanhood: Female Identity in Modern Spain,  University of New York, 1998, (co-editor with Victoria Lorée Enders)
 Modern Spain: 1808 to the Present, John Wiley & Sons, May 8, 2017
 Making Democratic Citizens in Spain: Civil Society and the Popular Origins of the Transition, Basingstoke, Hampshire, UK; New York: Palgrave Macmillan, 2011. xvii plus 414 pp.

References

People from Clifton, New Jersey
People from Escondido, California
People from Passaic, New Jersey
Scripps College alumni
Columbia University alumni
University of California, San Diego faculty
American women historians
1956 births
Historians of the Spanish Civil War
20th-century American historians
Living people
Historians from California
Historians from New Jersey